The East-West Gateway Council of Governments (EWGCOG or EWG) is the official  Council of Governments and Metropolitan planning organization for Greater St. Louis, USA. It was incorporated in 1965.

Purpose
The council coordinates planning and problem solving in areas of governmental responsibility for transportation planning that impact more than one jurisdiction in the Greater St Louis area. The organization serves St. Louis City. Franklin County, Jefferson County, St. Charles County, and St. Louis County in Missouri, plus Madison County, Monroe County, and St. Clair County in Illinois. It included highway expansion and planning public transportation.

Governance
The council is headed by a Board of Directors as official governance, with associate members from throughout the region.

External links
 Official Website

Greater St. Louis
Metropolitan planning organizations
Urban planning in the United States
Councils of governments
County government in Missouri
County government in Illinois
Government of St. Louis